The Colgate Raiders men's lacrosse team represents Colgate University in the Patriot League in National Collegiate Athletic Association (NCAA) Division I college lacrosse.  They play at Crown Field at Andy Kerr Stadium in Hamilton, New York.

History

The program first started at the varsity level in 1921. Since then, the team has amassed a record of 472-528–6 through 2019. The coach is currently Matt Karweck.

Colgate has made three appearances in the NCAA Tournament, with the first coming in 2008. They earned an automatic bid into the tournament by winning the Patriot League conference tournament over Bucknell, 13–9.

Their first NCAA Tournament game ended in defeat, losing 8–7 in overtime against Notre Dame. The Raiders would not make the tournament again until 2012 NCAA Division I Men's Lacrosse Championship, in which they defeated Massachusetts, 13–11, for their first ever NCAA Tournament victory.

Peter Baum played for the Raiders and was the 2012 Tewaaraton Trophy winner as the Division I Player of the Year, and won the Lt. Raymond J. Enners Award as the nation's top player, as was also the first overall pick of the 2012 Major League Lacrosse draft. He ended his career as the Patriot League's all-time leader in goals scored (164), the nation's active goal-scoring leader and hat-trick leader (34), and Colgate's all-time leader in goals and career points (225).

Season results
The following is a list of Colgate's season results since the institution of NCAA Division I in 1971:

{| class="wikitable"

|- align="center"

†NCAA canceled 2020 collegiate activities due to the COVID-19 virus.

References

External links
 

 
1921 establishments in New York (state)
Lacrosse clubs established in 1921